Zvyozdny gorodok may refer to:
Zvyozdny gorodok (urban-type settlement), an urban-type settlement in Moscow Oblast, Russia
Zvyozdny gorodok Urban Okrug, the municipal formation this urban-type settlement is incorporated as
Star City, Russia, a military research and space training facility in that urban-type settlement
Yuri Gagarin Cosmonaut Training Center, a training center in that facility